The Company You Keep may refer to:

 The Company You Keep (John Gorka album) (2001)
 The Company You Keep (Alison Brown album) (2009)
 The Company You Keep (film), a 2012 political thriller film
 The Company You Keep (TV series), a 2023 American television series

See also

 The Company We Keep, an album by the Del McCoury Band